This article lists the discography of Nick Oliveri. Oliveri is an American multi-instrumentalist who is best known for his work as a member of Kyuss and Queens of the Stone Age. Oliveri frequently contributes to the work of other artists as a solo artist, most notably on ...Like Clockwork, a 2013 Queens of the Stone Age album, for which he provided backing vocals on "If I Had a Tail".

Releases 
The following is a list of releases that include Nick Oliveri as an official band member.

Kyuss
 Wretch (1991, Dali)
 Blues for the Red Sun (1992, Dali)
 Muchas Gracias: The Best of Kyuss (2000, Elektra)

Queens of the Stone Age

 Rated R (2000, Interscope) (re-released 2010, Interscope)
 Songs for the Deaf (2002, Interscope)
 Stone Age Complication (2004, Interscope)

Mondo Generator
 Cocaine Rodeo (2000, Southern Lord) (2009, Impedance)
 A Drug Problem That Never Existed (2003, Ipecac)
 Use Once and Destroy Me (2004, Tornado) (DVD)
 III the EP (2004, Tornado)
 Dead Planet: SonicSlowMotionTrails (2006, Mother Tongue) / Dead Planet (2007, Sub Noize)
 Australian Tour EP (2008, Impedance)
 Dog Food EP (2010, Impedance)
 Hell Comes To Your Heart EP (2011, No Balls Records)
 Hell Comes To Your Heart (LP) (2012, Mondo Media)
 Split 7-inch EP w/ The Chuck Norris Experiment (2013, Strange Magic Records)
 The Best of Mondo Generator (2016, Heavy Psych Sounds Records)
 Fuck It (2020, Heavy Psych Sounds Records)
 Shooters Bible (2020, Heavy Psych Sounds Records)
 Live at Bronson (2021, Heavy Psych Sounds Records)

Dwarves
 The Dwarves Are Young and Good Looking (1997, Recess Records, later Epitaph)
 The Dwarves Come Clean (2000, Epitaph)
 How To Win Friends And Influence People (2001, Reptilian Records)
 The Dwarves Must Die (2004, Sympathy for the Record Industry)
 The Dwarves Are Born Again (2011, MVD Audio)
 The Dwarves Invented Rock & Roll (2014, Recess)
 Radio Free Dwarves (2015, Riot Style Records / Greedy)
 Take Back the Night (2018, Burger Records / Greedy)
 Rex Everything (2018, Bang! Records / Greedy)

Solo
 Demolition Day (2004, Tornado)
 Death Acoustic  (2009, Impedance)
 Nick Oliveri Vs The Chuck Norris Experiment (2012, No Balls Records)
 Nick Oliveri Vs HeWhoCannotBeNamed 7-inch split (2013, No Balls Records)
 Leave Me Alone (2014, Schnitzel Records) (released under the name "Nick Oliveri's Uncontrollable")

 N.O. Hits at All Vol.1 (2017, Heavy Psych Sounds Records)
 N.O. Hits at All Vol.2 (2017, Heavy Psych Sounds Records)
 N.O. Hits at All Vol.3 (2017, Heavy Psych Sounds Records)
 N.O. Hits at All Vol.4 (2018, Heavy Psych Sounds Records)
 N.O. Hits at All Vol.5 (2018, Heavy Psych Sounds Records)
 N.O. Hits at All Vol.666 (2020, Heavy Psych Sounds Records)
 N.O. Hits at All Vol.7 (2021, Heavy Psych Sounds Records)

Vista Chino
 Peace (2013, Napalm Records)

Bloodclot
 Up in Arms (2017, Metal Blade Records)

Stöner
 Live in the Mojave Desert: Volume 4 (2021, Heavy Psych Sounds Records/Giant Rock Records)
 Stoners Rule (2021, Heavy Psych Sounds Records)
 Totally... (2022, Heavy Psych Sounds Records)
 Boogie to Baja (2023, Heavy Psych Sounds Records)

Collaborations 
The following is a list of artists whose releases feature contributions from Nick Oliveri.
 Blag Dahlia Band – Lord of the Road (1994, Sympathy for the Record Industry)
 Blag Dahlia – Haunt Me (1995, Man's Ruin)
 Blag Dahlia – Venus With Arms (1996, Atavistic)
 Desert Sessions – Vols. 3&4 (1998, Man's Ruin)
 Desert Sessions – Vols. 5&6 (1999, Man's Ruin)
 River City Rapists – Feelin' Groovy (1999, Man's Ruin)
 Masters of Reality – Deep in the Hole (2001, Brownhouse)
 The Dangerous Lives of Altar Boys OST (2002, Milan Records)
 Rollins Band – Rise Above: 24 Black Flag Songs to Benefit the West Memphis Three (2002, Sanctuary Records)
 Masters of Reality – Flak 'n' Flight (2003, Brownhouse)
 Mark Lanegan Band – Here Comes That Weird Chill (2003, Beggars Banquet)
 Mark Lanegan Band – Bubblegum (2004, Beggar's Banquet)
 Eagles of Death Metal – Peace, Love, Death Metal (2004, AntAcidAudio)
 Melissa Auf der Maur – Auf der Maur (2004, Capitol)
 Turbonegro – Party Animals (2005, Bitzcore)
 Brats on the Beat: Ramones for Kids (2006, Go-Kart Records)
 Biblical Proof of UFOs – 8-Track Demo(n)s (2006, Cobraside Distribution, Inc.)
 Winnebago Deal – Flight of the Raven (2006, Fierce Panda)
 Winnebago Deal – "Spider Bite" (2006, Fierce Panda)
 Don't Open Your Eyes – "Don't Open Your Eyes" (2009, Flying with the Unicorn)
 Royce Cracker – "Doin' Watcha Say" (2009, Zodiac Killer Records)
 Slash – Slash (2010, Sony Music)
 Drink Fight Fuck Vol 4: 22 GG Allin Songs – "Outlaw Scumfuc" (2010, Zodiac Killer Records)
 HeWhoCannotBeNamed – Sunday School Massacre (2010, No Balls Records)
 Rescue Rangers – Manitoba (2012, Trendkill Recordings)
 Queens of the Stone Age – ...Like Clockwork (2013, Matador Records)
 Loading Data – Double Disco Animal Style (2013, A Quick One Records)
 John Garcia – John Garcia (2014, Napalm Records)
 Teenage Time Killers – Teenage Time Killers: Greatest Hits Vol. 1 (2015, Rise Records)
 Svetlanas – Naked Horse Rider (2015, Altercation Records)
 Komatsu – Recipe for Murder One (2016, Argonauta Records)
 Svetlanas – This is Moscow Not L.A. (2017, Rad Girlfriend Records)
 Lujuria – Sextorsión (2017, Punch Your Face Records, Dulce Limon Records)
 Brant Bjork – Mankind Woman (2018, Heavy Psych Sounds Records)
 Supervillain – That Boy's a Beast (2019)
 Phil Campbell – Old Lions Still Roar (2019, Nuclear Blast)
 Big Scenic Nowhere – Dying on the Mountain (2019, Blues Funeral Recordings)
 Big Scenic Nowhere – Vision Beyond Horizon (2020, Satin Records)
 Svetlanas – Disco Sucks (2020, Demons Run Amok Entertainment)
 The Black Armada – "Up & Down Under" (2020, Beats Cartel) (released under the name "Nick Oliveri and The Black Armada")
 Full Tone Generator – Without a Sound / If You Want Me (2020, Golden Robot Records) (released under the name "Full Tone Generator & Nick Oliveri)
 Patrón – Patrón (2020, Klonosphere)
 Bram Stalker – "Dormant" (2021)
 Soldiers of Destruction – Cause and Affect (2021, American't Records)
 Gunash – All You Can Hit (2022, Golden Robot Records)
 Löve Me Förever: A Tribute to Motörhead (2022, Psycho Waxx)
 Brant Bjork – Bougainvillea Suite (2022, Heavy Psych Sounds Records)

Singles 
The following is a list of singles that include Nick Oliveri as an official band member.

Kyuss
 "Thong Song" (1992, Dali)
 "Green Machine" (1993, Dali)

Queens of the Stone Age 
 "Infinity" – Heavy Metal 2000 OST (2000, Restless)
 "The Lost Art of Keeping a Secret" (2000, Interscope)
 "Feel Good Hit of the Summer"  (2000, Interscope)
 "Monsters in the Parasol" (2000, Interscope)
 "Back to Dungaree High" – Alpha Motherfuckers – A Tribute to Turbonegro (2001, Bitzcore)
 "No One Knows / Tension Head" (live) – 7-inch (2002, Interscope)
 "Go with the Flow" – EP (2002, Interscope)
 "First It Giveth / Wake Up Screaming" – 7-inch (2003, Interscope)

Mondo Generator
 Split 7-inch Single w/ Jack Saints (1997, Milk*Sop Records)
 "I Never Sleep" – 7-inch (2006, Mother Tongue)
 "Turbonegro Must Be Destroyed" – Omega Motherfuckers (2013, Self Destructo Records)
 "Up Against the Void" – split 7-inch Australian tour split w/ Svetlanas (2019, Tuff Cuff Records)
 "When Death Comes" (2019, Heavy Psych Sounds Records)
 "Dead Silence" (2019, Heavy Psych Sounds Records)
 "Turboner" (2020, Heavy Psych Sounds Records)
 "Dead Silence – Live at Bronson" (2021, Heavy Psych Sounds Records)

Dwarves
 "Gentlemen Prefer Blondes" (1994, Man's Ruin)
 "Everybodies Girl" (1997, Recess Records)
 "We Must Have Blood" (1997, Man's Ruin)
 "I Will Deny" (1998, Reptilian Records)
 "Salt Lake City" (2004, Sympathy for the Record Industry)
 "You Got Nothing" – split 7-inch single w/ Svetlanas (2016, Greedy/Altercation Records)
 "Devil's Level" (2017, Cleopatra Records)

Solo
 "Human Cannonball Explodes" (2014, Schnitzel Records) (released under the name "Nick Oliveri's Uncontrollable")

Vista Chino
 "Sweet Remain" (2013, Napalm Records)
 "Barcelonian" (2013, Napalm Records)

Bloodclot
 "Up In Arms" (2016, (Metal Blade Records)
 "Kali" (2017, Metal Blade Records)
 "Manic" (2017, Metal Blade Records)
 "Slow Kill Genocide" (2017, Metal Blade Records)

Stöner
 "Nothin" (2021, Heavy Psych Sounds Records)
 "Rad Stays Rad" (2021, Heavy Psych Sounds Records)
 "A Million Beers" (2022, Heavy Psych Sounds Records)
 "Party March" (2022, Heavy Psych Sounds Records)
 "Strawberry Creek (Dirty Feet)" (2022, Heavy Psych Sounds Records)
 "City Kids" (2022, Heavy Psych Sounds Records)
 "It Ain't Free" (2022, Heavy Psych Sounds Records)
 "Night Tripper vs. No Brainer" (2023, Heavy Psych Sounds Records)

References 

Discographies of American artists